Dom Sebastian Gabriel de Borbón y Braganza, (Rio de Janeiro, 4 November 1811 – Pau, 14 February 1875) Infante of Portugal and Spain, was an Iberian prince of the 19th century, progenitor of the Spanish ducal lines of Hernani, Ansola, Dúrcal and Marchena, and Carlist army commander in the First Carlist War.

Family 
He was born in Rio de Janeiro in 1811 as the only child of Infanta Maria Teresa of Portugal and Infante Pedro Carlos of Spain and Portugal. His mother was the eldest daughter of King John VI of Portugal (and also a granddaughter of King Charles IV of Spain); and his father, who died shortly after Sebastian was born, was a male-line grandson of King Charles III of Spain, as well as a female-line grandson of the Queen regnant Maria I of Portugal and Brazil. 

Sebastian was soon granted the title of Infante of Portugal by alvará of 9 December 1811. As he was only a great-grandson in the male line of a Spanish monarch, he was not a Spanish infante from birth, however in 1824 he was granted the style Infante of Spain by his maternal granduncle, Ferdinand VII of Spain.

Civil War 
In Portugal, the country was in effective civil war since 1826, when "usurper-king" Miguel I of Portugal and his elder brother Pedro IV of Portugal (both were Sebastian's uncles) battled, until 1834.

Sebastian's mother remarried two decades later, in 1838, her uncle, Don Carlos María Isidro, the first Carlist pretender to the throne of Spain. Teresa had been a Carlist supporter since the succession dispute started in 1833, and spent her time in the Carlist camp, usually in northern Spain.

Sebastian participated in the second siege of Bilbao and became commander of the Carlist Army of the North from December 30, 1836. He won the Battle of Oriamendi (March 16, 1837) against the British Legion under George de Lacy Evans. Then he led the failed Royal Expedition against Madrid and was sacked upon its return to the north in late 1837.

Titles
On January 15, 1837, during the First Carlist War, the then 23-year-old Sebastian was excluded, by law of the Cortes, ratified by royal decree of Queen Regent Maria Christina, from the Spanish succession, on the grounds that he had joined Don Carlos' rebellion against Isabella II of Spain. Sebastian was also declared to be stripped of his Spanish titles and status as a dynast.

The same exclusion was legislated against Sebastian's mother and uncle, the deposed Miguel I of Portugal, as well as Don Carlos and his sons,.

In 1859 Sebastian was restored to his Spanish titles, in conjunction with his second marriage. He returned to Spain from Naples where he had lived since the end of the war in 1839.

Marriage and family
Sebastian first wed his cousin Princess Maria Amalia of the Two Sicilies, but the marriage, which lasted several decades, remained childless. When widowed at the age of 50 he remarried, on 19 November 1860, his cousin Infanta María Cristina of Spain, the niece of his first wife, and two decades his junior. Their three eldest sons, all Spanish dynasts until their marriages, were each granted dukedoms.

Their children, reckoned members of the House of Bourbon-Braganza, were:
 Don Francisco María de Borbón y Borbón, 1st Duke of Marchena (Madrid, 1861 – Neuilly-sur-Seine, 1923), married María del Pilar de Muguiro y Beruete, 1st Duchess of Villafranca de los Caballeros.
 Don Pedro de Alcántara de Borbón y Borbón, 1st Duke of Dúrcal (Madrid, 1862 – Paris, 1892), married María de la Caridad de Madán y Uriondo.
 Don Luis de Jesús de Borbón y Borbón, 1st Duke of Ansola (Madrid, 1864 – Algiers, 1889), married Ana Germana Bernaldo de Quirós y Muñoz, 1st Marquise of Atarfe.
 Don Alfonso María de Borbón y Borbón (Madrid, 1866 – Madrid, 1934), married Julia Méndez y Morales.
 Don Gabriel Jesús de Borbón y Borbón (Pau, 1869 – Madrid, 1889).

The last head of one of these branches, the Duke of Hernani, adopted in the 1970s their distant cousin, Infanta Margarita of Spain, Duchess of Soria, who thus became the next and current Duchess of Hernani.

After the overthrow of Isabella II of Spain in 1868 Sebastian moved to Pau, where he tried to reconcile the Carlist and Isabeline branches of the House of Bourbon, without success.

Descendants appeared in The United Kingdom in the early 20th century. Adopting the anglicised name, Borbon.

Arms

Ancestors

References

Spanish generals
1811 births
1875 deaths
House of Bourbon-Braganza
Portuguese infantes
Spanish infantes
People from Rio de Janeiro (city)
Burials in the Pantheon of Infantes at El Escorial
Military personnel of the First Carlist War
Knights Grand Cross of the Order of the Immaculate Conception of Vila Viçosa
Knights of the Golden Fleece of Spain
Laureate Cross of Saint Ferdinand